Stephen William Borthwick (born 12 October 1979) is an English rugby union coach who played lock for Bath and Saracens. At International level, he represented the senior England rugby union team between 2001 and 2010 and captained them between 2008 and 2010. He was appointed the England forwards coach in December 2015; a role which he left in mid 2020 to become head coach of Leicester Tigers. In December 2022 he was appointed as the England Head Coach.

Club career
Born in Carlisle, Cumbria, Borthwick was captain of the Hutton Grammar School rugby team, with whom he went on a tour to Australia.

Bath: 1998–2008
Borthwick joined Bath in 1998 from Preston Grasshoppers, making his debut against Saracens in December 1998. During this time, he was balancing rugby commitments with study, and graduated from the University of Bath in 2003 with a degree in Economics with Politics.

Borthwick had, arguably, his best season for Bath in 2003–04. A central figure in the absence of many senior players due to the 2003 Rugby World Cup, he set about making his mark on the Zurich Premiership. Bath made the League Final that season, losing to London Wasps. He was one of the three nominees for the Zurich Premiership Player of the Year award. In his final game with the club, Borthwick captained Bath to victory in the 2007–08 European Challenge Cup.

In January 2008, Borthwick announced that he would be leaving Bath at the end of the 2007–08 season for Saracens F.C.

Saracens: 2008–2014
Following his switch to Saracens, Borthwick was named co-captain for the 2008–09 season alongside Andy Farrell.

In the 2009–10 season he was named as the captain for Saracens F.C. Injury prevented him from playing for much of the season: he returned for the Guinness Premiership final, but not as captain, as Saracens were defeated by the Leicester Tigers. However the following season he started as Saracens won their first Premiership title.

On 28 November 2013, Borthwick announced he would be retiring at the end of the 2013-2014 season.

International career
Borthwick first emerged during England's 2000 tour of South Africa. Despite his presence in the line-out, he was not considered heavy enough for international rugby, but later bulked out. A regular choice as the England A team captain, from his debut against Wales A at Wrexham in February 2001, he had already played on the full tour of South Africa the previous summer. Injury prevented him from being considered for the 2002 trip to Argentina. Borthwick made his debut for England against France in the 2001 Six Nations.

He came on as a blood replacement for Ben Kay in the 25–14 win over Australia in Melbourne in June 2003, his sixth cap. A member of England's wider 2003 World Cup squad, he narrowly missed selection to the final 30. He regained his place in the England squad after the 2003 World Cup and despite England's disappointing results, Borthwick was given credit for his solid play.

Borthwick initially failed to make England's squad for the 2005 Autumn internationals, with Gloucester forward Alex Brown seemingly poised for a start instead, but injury ruled Brown out of contention and Borthwick stepped in, playing a significant role against Australia, New Zealand and Samoa.

Borthwick was selected as a member of the England 2007 Rugby World Cup squad. He played in three Group matches, starting against Tonga. He did not participate in the knockout games.

Captaincy
On 10 February 2008 Borthwick was named captain for England's 2008 Six Nations match against Italy in Rome, and on 13 May 2008 he was chosen to captain the full England squad on their 2008 summer tour of New Zealand. In October 2008 he was named as Martin Johnson's first England captain for the 2008 Autumn Internationals.
Borthwick came in for a lot of criticism after England's disappointing 2008 Autumn Internationals in which they suffered heavy defeats to New Zealand and South Africa. However Martin Johnson kept faith in him.

In the 2009 Six Nations, Borthwick came under more criticism as England's discipline cost them victories against Ireland and Wales. However, after performing much better against France and Scotland in the last two weeks of the tournament, Borthwick's critics seemed to leave him alone.

End of international career
In January 2010, Borthwick was confirmed as England captain for the 2010 Six Nations.
After England's 15–15 draw against Scotland in the 2010 Six Nations, Borthwick aggravated an ongoing knee injury and sought medical advice. This meant he was unavailable for selection against France so Tom Palmer was bought in as cover and Lewis Moody was given the captaincy. 

Due to injury, Borthwick was not a member of the 2010 England rugby union tour of Australasia.
On 1 July 2010, he was dropped from the Elite Player Squad by Martin Johnson.

Coaching career
Borthwick trained as a coach, taking his initial position in-club from 2012 whilst playing with Saracens, and also attending the University of Hertfordshire. From 2012 he was forwards coach alongside Eddie Jones for  up to and including the 2015 Rugby World Cup, after which he was confirmed as forwards coach for Bristol Rugby under former Bath colleague Andy Robinson.

On 15 December 2015, he was confirmed as England Forwards coach.

In October 2019, it was reported by BBC Sport that Borthwick's next role would be with Leicester Tigers following the 2019 Rugby World Cup. It was later confirmed he would join the club as head coach for the 2020–21 Premiership Rugby season. Next season, Borthwick led the Tigers to their eleventh Premiership title during the 2021–22 season. 

On 19 December 2022, it was announced that Borthwick would take over as head coach of the England men's rugby team, replacing Eddie Jones.

Personal life 
Borthwick is married and has two sons.

References

External links
Saracens profile
Bath profile
Premiership profile
England profile
Steve Borthwick photo 1 by sportingheroes. net
Steve Borthwick photo 2 by sportingheroes. net

1979 births
Living people
Alumni of the University of Bath
Alumni of the University of Hertfordshire
Bath Rugby players
England international rugby union players
English people of Scottish descent
English rugby union coaches
English rugby union players
Lancashire County RFU players
Leicester Tigers coaches
People educated at Hutton Grammar School
Rugby union locks
Rugby union players from Carlisle, Cumbria
Saracens F.C. players
Team Bath rugby union players
England national rugby union team coaches